Air Cargo News publishes industry newspapers and magazines and digital information for senior executives, managers and sales agents in the freight forwarding, airline, airport and cargo handling sector. It is based at Sutton in Surrey in the United Kingdom, and is part of UK-based DVV Media International Ltd.

Air Cargo News
Air Cargo News is an industry website and quarterly print magazine. There are regular contributions from respected industry journalists including Damian Brett, Rebecca Jeffrey, Roger Hailey and Ian Putzger.

Events
 Cargo Airline of the Year is an annual award ceremony established in 1983. More than 25 000 supply chain professionals around the world vote for the best in the air logistics business. The awards are the only event where the British International Freight Association audits and approves the votes cast. American Airlines Cargo was voted Air Cargo News Cargo Airline of the Year in April 2015.

References

External links
 Official website

Aviation magazines
Transport magazines published in the United Kingdom
Biweekly magazines published in the United Kingdom
Magazines established in 1983
Mass media in Surrey